The black-striped squirrel (Callosciurus nigrovittatus) is a species of rodent in the family Sciuridae.
It is found throughout Java, Sumatra, southern Thailand, the Malay Peninsula, and numerous small islands. This taxon consists of four subspecies: C. n. nigrovittatus, C. n. bilimitatus, C. n. bocki, and C. n. klossi. It is listed as "least concern" by the IUCN.

References

Callosciurus
Rodents of Indonesia
Rodents of Malaysia
Rodents of Thailand
Mammals described in 1824
Taxonomy articles created by Polbot